Boat Trip is a 2002 American romantic comedy film directed by Mort Nathan in his feature film directorial debut and starring Cuba Gooding Jr., Horatio Sanz, Vivica A. Fox, Roselyn Sánchez, and Roger Moore. The film was released in the United States on March 21, 2003, and was a critical and commercial failure.

Plot 
Jerry (Cuba Gooding Jr.) and Nick (Horatio Sanz) are two close friends whose love lives have hit rock bottom. Jerry's girlfriend Felicia (Vivica A. Fox) has turned down his marriage proposal after vomiting all over her during a hot air balloon ride during the proposal. After Nick runs into a friend who is marrying a beautiful, younger girl he met on a singles cruise, he decides to take a similar cruise with Jerry.

While on their way to the travel agency, they get into a verbal altercation with a gay man who works at the agency they plan to book the cruise through. The manager (Will Ferrell) attempts to patch things up by handling their booking personally. To Jerry and Nick, the situation appears to be handled well and they leave, not expecting anything to go wrong. After they leave, it is revealed that the agent and manager, both men, are actually gay lovers, and that they have been booked on a cruise for gay men.

During their trip, they come to learn that gay men are less objectionable than they first assumed. However, Jerry falls in love with the cruise's dance instructor Gabriella (Roselyn Sánchez) and in order to win her over, he pretends to be gay so he can get closer to her. Meanwhile, Nick blossoms a romance with a bikini model named Inga (Victoria Silvstedt). After an accidental affair with her mean, sex-obsessed coach Sonya (Lin Shaye), Nick must fend her off, after she has fallen in love with him as well.

In the end, Jerry wins Gabriella while Nick loses out on Inga but sees a potential relationship with her sister instead. However, he is then unwittingly (and unwillingly) reunited with Sonya; much to his disgust and her instant arousal upon seeing him.

Cast 
 Cuba Gooding Jr. as Jerry Robinson
 Horatio Sanz as Nick Ragoni
 Roselyn Sánchez as Gabriella
 Vivica A. Fox as Felicia
 Maurice Godin as Hector
 Roger Moore as Lloyd Faversham
 Lin Shaye as Coach Sonya
 Victoria Silvstedt as Inga
 Ken Campbell as Tom
 Zen Gesner as Ron
 William Bumiller as Steven
 Noah York as Perry
 Thomas Lennon as Pastor
 Richard Roundtree as Felicia's Dad
 Bob Gunton as Boat Captain
 Jennifer Gareis as Sheri
 Will Ferrell as Michael, Brian's boyfriend
 Artie Lange as Brian
 Jami Ferrell as Bridget

Production
In October 2002, Artisan Pictures acquired the North American distribution rights to Boat Trip.

Reception

Box office 
Boat Trip was released in the UK on October 4, 2002, and in the US and Canada on March 21, 2003, where the film opened at #10 and grossed $3,815,075 in 1715 theatres. In total, it had a worldwide gross of $15,020,293.  It was released on DVD in the US on September 30, 2003.

Critical response 
This film was panned by critics on its initial release. On Rotten Tomatoes, the film has an approval rating of 7%, based on reviews from 90 critics, with an average rating of 3.10/10. The site's consensus reads: "Boat Trip is a lame, juvenile farce that's heavy on stereotypes and desperate antics but short on brains and laughs." On Metacritic, it has a score of 18 out of 100, based on 28 reviews, indicating "overwhelming dislike" by critics.

Roger Ebert of the Chicago Sun-Times panned the film and wrote: "This is a movie made for nobody, about nothing." He continued: "Not that the film is outrageous. That would be asking too much. It is dim-witted, unfunny, too shallow to be offensive." Ebert included it at #3 on his list of the 10 worst films of 2003.
Variety called it a "Washout. Lacking the mojo even to be offensive".

Many viewed the film as homophobic, although a reviewer for The Advocate wrote that the film was too terrible to protest. On the show Ebert & Roeper, Roger Ebert said the film "was so bad in so many different ways, not only does it offend gays, it offends everyone else." His co-host Richard Roeper said, "If the ship hit an iceberg, I would have been rooting for the iceberg."
Chris Rock mentioned Gooding during the 2005 Oscars telecast for starring in this movie after receiving an Academy Award, joking that Gooding must have had serious financial problems to need star in such a bad film.

Accolades
The film was nominated for two Razzie Awards for Gooding as Worst Actor and for Mort Nathan as Worst Director, but "lost" both awards to Gigli. At the 2003 Stinkers Bad Movie Awards, the film received five nominations: Worst Picture, Worst Actor for Gooding, Worst Supporting Actor for Moore, Most Painfully Unfunny Comedy, and Worst On-Screen Couple for Gooding and anyone forced to co-star with him. Its only win was for Most Painfully Unfunny Comedy.

References

External links 
 
 

2002 films
2000s buddy comedy films
2002 LGBT-related films
2002 romantic comedy films
American buddy comedy films
American LGBT-related films
American romantic comedy films
American screwball comedy films
Artisan Entertainment films
2000s English-language films
Films set in Los Angeles
Films set on cruise ships
Films shot in Cologne
Films shot in Greece
Gay-related films
LGBT-related romantic comedy films
LGBT-related controversies in film
Seafaring films
Films scored by Robert Folk
2000s screwball comedy films
2002 directorial debut films
Homophobia in fiction
Films about anti-LGBT sentiment
2000s American films